Frederick Augustus, may refer to:

Frederick I, Holy Roman Emperor (1122–90), better known as Frederick Barbarossa 
Frederick Augustus, Duke of Württemberg-Neuenstadt (1654–1716)
Friedrich August of Hanover, Prince (1661-1690), younger brother of King George I of Great Britain
Frederick Augustus I, Elector of Saxony (1670–1733), better known as King Frederick August II of Poland
Frederick Augustus II, Elector of Saxony (1696–1763) better known as King August III of Poland
Frederick Augustus I of Oldenburg (1711–1785)
Frederick Augustus, Prince of Anhalt-Zerbst (1734–93)
Frederick Augustus, Duke of Nassau (1738–1816)
Frederick Augustus, Prince of Brunswick-Wolfenbüttel-Oels (1740–1805)
Frederick Augustus III, Elector of Saxony (1750–1827), who then became King Frederick Augustus I of Saxony
Frederick Augustus, Count of Erbach-Fürstenau (1754–1784)
Prince Frederick, Duke of York and Albany (1763–1827), son of George III of the United Kingdom
Frederick Augustus II of Saxony (1797–1854)
Frederick Augustus II, Grand Duke of Oldenburg (1852–1931)
Frederick Augustus III of Saxony (1865–1932), last king of Saxony

See also 
Augustus (disambiguation)
Ernest August